Mount Dalrymple is a mountain in the Clarke Range, ]], located in Central Queensland, Australia. The peak and surrounding ranges are covered in dense tropical rainforest and forms part of the Eungella National Park.

It was named after George Elphinstone Dalrymple, an early European explorer of north Queensland.

See also

List of mountains in Queensland

References

Mountains of Queensland
Central Queensland